Martina Hingis and Sania Mirza were the defending champions, but chose not to participate together. Mirza played alongside Yaroslava Shvedova, but lost in the semifinals to Chan Yung-jan and Hingis.

Chan and Hingis went on to win the title, defeating Ekaterina Makarova and Elena Vesnina in the final, 7–5, 7–6(7–4).

Seeds
The top four seeds received a bye into the second round.

Draw

Finals

Top half

Bottom half

References
 Main Draw

Women's Doubles